The fourth season of Melrose Place, an American television series, premiered on Fox on September 11, 1995. The season four finale aired on May 20, 1996, after 34 episodes. 

The season was produced by Chip Hayes and Kimberly Costello, co-producers Dee Johnson and Allison Robinson, co-executive producers Carol Mendelsohn and Charles Pratt Jr., and executive producers Aaron Spelling, E. Duke Vincent and Frank South. 

This is the first season without the involvement of creator Darren Star, who left the series for Central Park West on CBS.

The season was released on DVD as an eight-disc box set under the title of Melrose Place - The Complete Fourth Season on April 15, 2008 by Paramount Home Video. It was the last season to be released as a single-volume DVD box set.

Storylines

Kimberly sets off a series of explosions which destroy half the Melrose apartment complex. Surprisingly, only Jane's potential new boss (Richard Hart's ex-wife Mackenzie Hart) is killed, and Alison is temporarily blinded. Peter and Michael join in a private practice, Mancini-Burns, at Wilshire Hospital.

Jess' death in the fall at the construction site leaves Jake plagued by guilt. He sleeps with Shelly Hanson (Hudson Leick), Jess' ex-wife (in town for his funeral), and hires her at Shooters. She plans to ruin Jake financially as revenge for what she sees as Jake killing her ex-husband. Jake sees the light after she tries to murder him, and she is arrested.

Matt is exonerated of Paul's wife's murder when Paul makes a deathbed confession after he is shot by the police. But Matt's boss, Calvin Hobbs (Francis McCarthy)—the Wilshire chief-of-staff who replaced Peter—fires him anyway for his inappropriate relationship with Paul.  Matt wins another sexual discrimination lawsuit after his attorney goads Hobbs into making homophobic statements in court. Matt uses the settlement to enroll in medical school, and works at Wilshire Hospital as an intern.

Kimberly is declared legally insane after the bombing and institutionalized. Peter cares for her, telling Sydney that his concern stems from the memory of his late sister (who had similar mental problems). Kimberly says she was encouraged in violence by a man named Henry; her mother recalls Henry, the family gardener whom Kimberly stabbed to death as a child when he tried to rape her mother. Kimberly is released to Peter, but is lonely when he begins to rekindle his romance with Amanda.

Her eyesight regained, Alison returns to D & D Advertising and marries Brooke's father, Hayley (Perry King); Brooke and Hayley interfere with each other's marriages. Discovering he is financially ruined, during a trip with Alison, Hayley drowns in a drunken fall from his yacht. Brooke and Billy's marriage is rocky due to her jealousy, dishonesty and cruelty. They reconcile after Brooke's suicide attempt, but Billy leaves her for good. A drunken Brooke slips, hits her head on the edge of the Melrose Place pool and drowns. Haunted by her death, Billy tries to keep her memory alive. Soon, he resorts to unethical decisions while at D&D, including sleeping with clients, though later realizes the error of his ways.

Amanda admits faking her death years ago in Miami to escape her violent husband, Jack Parezi (Antonio Sabato Jr.)—a businessman with Mafia connections—who tracks her to L.A. and dies in an accident. She ends her relationship with Peter when she is reunited with her long-lost first love, Jack's brother Bobby (John Enos III). Peter gets involved with Alycia Barnett (Anne-Marie Johnson), Matt's lawyer in the Paul Graham case, and they conspire to ruin Bobby so Alycia can control his cable-TV empire; Peter hopes to win Amanda back. When Bobby discovers the plot, he attacks Alycia at Peter's office and she accidentally knocks him out the high-rise window to his death. Peter is arrested for the death, and Alycia dies in a car accident when she tries to leave town.

Kimberly and Michael remarry, but she develops multiple-personality disorder and often reverts to a violent 1950s housewife named Betsy Jones. When she drives with Peter to the police station to provide his alibi for Bobby's death, Kimberly (as Betsy) instead commits him to a mental institution to avenge his declaring her insane.

Jo gets involved with Richard Hart after breaking up with Jake, creating a rift between her and Jane. Jane pretends to seduce Michael to make Richard jealous; this infuriates Sydney, who spikes Jane's drink with prescription pills which cause a paralyzing stroke. Jake begins a relationship with Jane as she recovered, but after Richard savagely beats and rapes her during a business trip to New York she breaks up with Jake in her determination to harm Richard.

Matt, in medical school classes and interning at Wilshire, begins a romance with closeted film actor Alan Ross (Lonnie Schuyler). Alan lies publicly about his sexual orientation, fearing that revealing his homosexuality would blacklist him in Hollywood. Behind Alan's back Matt begins a short-lived relationship with David (Rob Youngblood), who took his old social-services job at Wilshire Hospital, but feels guilty about cheating on Alan. He breaks up with Alan after he enters a lavender marriage with co-star Valerie Madison (Jeri Ryan) as a publicity move. When Matt contracts meningitis from a patient he becomes addicted to painkillers, stealing pills from the hospital's stores.

Jo begins a relationship with Matt's medical-school professor Dominick O'Malley (Brad Johnson), who helps her care for Matt and deal with Sydney's school friend in a spousal-abuse case. When Dominick invites her to join him in Bosnia as part of a Doctors Without Borders program, she hesitates at first but eventually agrees. Amanda and Michael try to rescue Peter from "Betsy" at the mental institution. Kimberly returns to reality before falling from a scaffold; comatose, she leaves Peter again in jail with no alibi for Bobby's murder. Although Billy asks Jake to help reunite him with Alison, Jake and Alison begin a relationship of their own.

In the season finale, Jane discovers that Sydney is responsible for her stroke and blackmails her into helping her murder Richard. Sydney apparently kills Richard with a shovel, and the sisters bury him in a field. In the final scene, however, Richard's hand pops out of the ground while Jane and Sydney speed off in their car.

Cast

Main cast members
In alphabetical order
 Josie Bissett as Jane Mancini 
 Thomas Calabro as Michael Mancini 
 Marcia Cross as Kimberly Shaw 
 Kristin Davis as Brooke Armstrong (episodes 1–22)
 Laura Leighton as Sydney Andrews 
 Doug Savant as Matt Fielding 
 Grant Show as Jake Hanson 
 Andrew Shue as Billy Campbell 
 Courtney Thorne-Smith as Alison Parker 
 Jack Wagner as Peter Burns
 Daphne Zuniga as Jo Reynolds

Special guest star
 Heather Locklear as Amanda Woodward

Recurring guest stars

 Perry King as Hayley Armstrong
 Patrick Muldoon as Richard Hart
 Morgan Brittany as MacKenzie Hart 
Anne-Marie Johnson as Alycia Barnett
 James Handy as Matt Fielding Sr.
 Claudette Nevins as Constance Fielding
 David Beecroft as Dr. Paul Graham 
 Francis Xavier McCarthy as Dr. Calvin Hobbs
 Zitto Kazann as Henry
Hudson Leick as Shelly Hanson
Antonio Sabàto Jr. as Jack Parezi
Janet Carroll as Marion Shaw
John McCann as Walter Kovacs
Morgan Stevens as Nick Diamond
Dr. Joyce Brothers as herself
Jan Hoag as Nurse Kelly
John Enos III as Bobby Parezi
David Groh as Vince Parezi
Page Moseley as Vic Munson
Lonnie Schuyler as Alan Ross
Danny Darst as Monty
Selma Archerd as Nurse Amy
Richard Molnar as Guy
 Belita Moreno as Gloria Bryan 
 Rob Youngblood as Dave Erickson
 Michael Des Barres as Arthur Field
Loni Anderson as Teri Carson
 Denise Richards as Brandi Carson
 Justine Priestley as Laurie
 Robert Bishop as Tyler
Brad Johnson as Dr. Dominick O'Malley
Nigel Gibbs as Detective Wylie
Michael Shamus Wiles as Dave
Leland Crooke as Louie
Garrett Warren as Ziggy
Lynn Chalmers as Nurse Lynn
Priscilla Presley as Nurse Benson
Brooke Langton as Samantha Reilly
Paul Perri as Andy
Neill Barry as Greg Parker

Episodes

References

1995 American television seasons
1996 American television seasons